Richmond Heights High School is a public high school located in Richmond Heights, Ohio, southeast of Cleveland, Ohio.  It is the only high school in the Richmond Heights School District.  It has a student body of 335 and a student-teacher ratio of 17:1.  Its mascot is the Spartan and its colors are royal blue and white. The school's designations in the recent years: "excellent" in 2006–2007, "effective" in 2007–2008, "effective" in 2008–2009. (There are six academic designations in Ohio: excellent with distinction, excellent, effective, continuous improvement, academic watch, academic emergency.)

Ohio High School Athletic Association State Championships

 Boys Basketball - 2022, 2023
 Wrestling - 1979,1980,1983,1984 
Dan Hanson, four-time state champ in Wrestling: 1984, 1985, 1986, 1987.

Notes and references

External links
 http://www.richmondheightsschools.org/
 http://education.ohio.gov/GD/Templates/Pages/ODE/ODEDetail.aspx?Page=3&TopicRelationID=115&ContentID=52790&Content=54563

High schools in Cuyahoga County, Ohio
Public high schools in Ohio